2 Quick Start is an Estonian band, created in 1992. In the 1990s, the band was one of the most notable dance music groups in Estonia.

In 2001, the band took an award in the "best band of the year" category at the Estonian Music Awards. At the 2018 Estonian Music Awards the band was granted an award for "Contribution to Estonian Music".

Members
Pearu Paulus – vocals
Ilmar Laisaar – percussions
Alar Kotkas – bass
Urmas Kahk – quitar
Jüri Mazurcak – drums

Discography

Albums
1994 "2 Quick Start" (Sounder Plk)			
1995 "Olen loobuda sust proovinud" (Aidem Pot)		
1997 "Poolel teel su juurde" (Aidem Pot) 		
1999 "Teine pool: The Very Best Of 2 Quick Start, Vol. 1" (2QS Production)
2001 "Ühega miljoneist" (2QS Production) 	
2010 "2010" (2QS Production)

References

External links
Pearu Paulus põhjendas, miks 2 Quick Start Eesti kalleimate bändide seas on, err.ee, 2018
GALERII Kõik on kohal! 2 Quick Start andis Saku suurhallis 25 tegutsemisaasta tähtsaima kontserdi, elu24.postimees.ee, 2018

Estonian musical groups
Musical groups established in 1992